Eucosmocydia is a genus of moths belonging to the family Tortricidae.

Species
Eucosmocydia mixographa (Meyrick, 1939)
Eucosmocydia oedipus Diakonoff, 1988

See also
List of Tortricidae genera

References

External links
tortricidae.com

Grapholitini
Tortricidae genera
Taxa named by Alexey Diakonoff